Andrei Spinu (born 10 June 1986) is a Moldovan entrepreneur and politician, who was Deputy Prime Minister and Minister of Infrastructure and Regional Development of the Republic of Moldova in the Government of Gavrilița.

References

1986 births
Living people
Moldovan politicians
Harvard Extension School alumni